Andrew Lynch (1819 – 2 November 1884) was an Australian politician.

He was a pastoralist at Carcoar before entering politics. In 1876 he was elected to the New South Wales Legislative Assembly for Carcoar, serving until his death in 1884.

References

1819 births
1884 deaths
Members of the New South Wales Legislative Assembly
19th-century Australian politicians